Schwerin (Mecklenburgisch-Vorpommersch Low German: Swerin; Latin: Suerina, Suerinum) is the capital and second-largest city of the northeastern German state of Mecklenburg-Vorpommern as well as of the region of Mecklenburg, after Rostock. It has around 96,000 inhabitants, and is thus the least populous of all German state capitals.

Schwerin is located on the southwestern shore of Lake Schwerin (Schweriner See), the second-largest lake of the Mecklenburg Lake Plateau after the Müritz, and there are eleven other lakes within Schwerin's city limits. The city is surrounded by the district of Northwestern Mecklenburg to the north, and the district of Ludwigslust-Parchim to the south. Schwerin and the two surrounding districts form the eastern outskirts of the Hamburg Metropolitan Region. The name of the city is of Slavic origin, deriving from the root "zvěŕ" (wild animal) or "zvěŕin" (game reserve, animal garden, stud farm).

Schwerin was first mentioned in 1018 as Zuarina and was granted city rights in 1160 by Henry the Lion, thus it is the oldest city of Mecklenburg-Vorpommern. As main residence of the House of Mecklenburg, a dynasty with Slavic roots also known as the Obotrites or Niklotides, Schwerin was the capital of the Duchy of Mecklenburg-Schwerin from 1379 to 1815, of the Grand Duchy of Mecklenburg-Schwerin (after the duke was elevated to the title of a grand duke) from 1815 to 1918, of the Free State of Mecklenburg-Schwerin from 1918 to 1934, of the State of Mecklenburg (after it was merged with the Free State of Mecklenburg-Strelitz) from 1934 to 1952, and of the District of Schwerin from 1952 to 1990.

The romantic Schwerin Palace, situated on Castle Island between Lake Schwerin and Castle Lake, known for its golden dome, the Castle Church, the throne room, and the Niklot statue, used to be the seat of the dukes and grand dukes of Mecklenburg-Schwerin, and since 1990, it is the seat of the state parliament of Mecklenburg-Vorpommern. Schwerin's silhouette is completed by the towers of Schwerin Cathedral, St Paul's Church and St Nicholas' Church. Because of only minor damage in World War II, the city has a largely intact building structure, both in the Altstadt (Old Town) and Schelfstadt (Reed City) quarters.

Major industries and employers include high technology, machine building, healthcare, government agencies, railway supply, consumer goods and tourism. Schwerin has two academic colleges, the Schwerin campus of the "Fachhochschule des Mittelstands" (University of Applied Sciences of the Mittelstand), and the Schwerin campus of the "Hochschule der Bundesagentur für Arbeit" (University of the Federal Employment Agency). There is a regional airport in Parchim, southeast of the city, while Hamburg Airport serves as the city's main airport.

History

Early years
Schwerin is enclosed by lakes. The largest of these lakes, the Schweriner See, has an area of 60 km2. In the middle part of these lakes there was a settlement of the Slavic Obotrite (dated back to the 11th century). The area was called Zuarin (Polabian Zwierzyn), and the name Schwerin is derived from that designation. In 1160, Henry the Lion defeated the Obotrites and captured Schwerin. The town was later expanded into a powerful regional centre. A castle was built on this site, and expanded to become a ducal palace. It is supposedly haunted by the small, impious ghost, called Petermännchen ("Peterman").

In 1358, Schwerin became a part of the Duchy of Mecklenburg, making it the seat of the duchy from then on. About 1500, the construction of the Schwerin Palace began, as a residence for the dukes. After the division of Mecklenburg (1621), Schwerin became the capital of the Duchy of Mecklenburg-Schwerin. Between 1765 and 1837, the town of Ludwigslust served as the capital, until Schwerin was reinstated.

Recent times
In the mid-1800s, many residents from Schwerin moved to the United States, many to Milwaukee, Wisconsin. Today Milwaukee and Schwerin are sister cities. After 1918, and during the German Revolution, resulting in the fall of all the German monarchies, the Grand Duke abdicated. Schwerin became capital of the Free State of Mecklenburg-Schwerin thereafter.

During World War II, Schwerin was hit by bombs in July 1940, on 7 April 1945 and 19 April 1945. At the end of World War II, on 2 May 1945, Schwerin was taken by United States troops. It was turned over to the British on 1 June 1945, and one month later, on 1 July 1945, it was handed over to the Soviet forces, as the British and American forces pulled back from the line of contact to the predesignated occupation zones.

Schwerin was then in the Soviet Occupation Zone which was to become the German Democratic Republic (GDR). Initially, it was the capital of the State of Mecklenburg which at that time included the western part of Pomerania (Vorpommern). After the states were dissolved in the GDR, in 1952, Schwerin served as the capital of the Schwerin district (Bezirk Schwerin).
 
After reunification in 1990, the former state of Mecklenburg-Vorpommern was recreated as one of the Bundesländer. Rostock was a serious contender for state capital but the decision went in favour of Schwerin.

Geography

Lakes 
The 12 lakes within Schwerin's city limits and their size in km2:
Lake Schwerin (Schweriner See) 61,5
Brick Lake (Ziegelsee) 3,0
Lake Ostorf (Ostorfer See) 2,1
New Mill Lake (Neumühler See) 1,7
Lake Medeweg (Medeweger See) 1,0
Lake Lankow (Lankower See) 0,5
Foul Lake (Fauler See) 0,5
Heaths Lake (Heidensee) 0,2
Clergymen's Pond (Pfaffenteich) 0,1
Castle Lake (Burgsee) 0,1
Lake Grimke (Grimkesee) 0,04
Big Karausche (Große Karausche) 0,02

Islands 
Rabbit Ait (Kaninchenwerder) in Lake Schwerin
Brick Ait (Ziegelwerder) in Lake Schwerin
Castle Island (Schlossinsel) between Lake Schwerin and Castle Lake
Big Murrkiten Island (Große Murrkiteninsel) in the Brick Lake
Small Murrkiten Island (Kleine Murrkiteninsel) in the Brick Lake
Big Stone (Großer Stein) in Lake Schwerin

Boroughs 
The urban area of Schwerin is subdivided into 17 local districts, each with a local council. The districts consist of one or more boroughs. The local councilors have between 5 and 15 members depending on the number of inhabitants. They are determined by the city council for the duration of the election period of the city council after each municipal election. The local councilors are to hear important matters concerning the district and have a right of initiative. However, the final decisions are made by the city council of the city as a whole.

The 17 districts and 26 boroughs:
Schelfstadt, Werdervorstadt, Schelfwerder (1)
Altstadt (Old Town), Feldstadt, Paulsstadt, Lewenberg (2)
Großer Dreesch (formerly Dreesch I) (3)
Neu Zippendorf (formerly Dreesch II) (4)
Mueßer Holz (formerly Dreesch III) (5)
Gartenstadt, Ostorf (formerly Haselholz, Ostorf) (6)
Lankow (7)
Weststadt (8)
Krebsförden (9)
Wüstmark, Göhrener Tannen (10)
Görries (11)
Friedrichsthal (12)
Neumühle, Sacktannen (13)
Warnitz (14)
Wickendorf, Medewege (15)
Zippendorf (16)
Mueß (17)
There is a small enclave between the boroughs of Neumühle and Görries, belonging to the neighbouring municipality of Klein Rogahn.

Schwerin clockwise borders the municipalities of Klein Trebbow (N), Seehof (Mecklenburg), Leezen (Mecklenburg) (lake border and border on Paul's Dam (Paulsdamm) only), Raben Steinfeld (E), Plate, Banzkow, Lübesse (S), Holthusen, Pampow, Klein Rogahn (W), Wittenförden, Brüsewitz, and Pingelshagen.

Transport
City buses and trams are run by NVS (Nahverkehr Schwerin).

Schwerin Hauptbahnhof (central station) is connected by rail to Berlin, Hamburg and Rostock.

Main sights
 The landmark of the city is the Schwerin Palace, located on an island in the lake of the same name (Schweriner See). It was, for centuries, the residence of the Dukes of Mecklenburg and today is the seat of the Landtag (state parliament).
 Schwerin Cathedral, built in 1260–1416 in Brick Gothic style.
 The Alter Garten (Old Garden) square, surrounded by buildings such as the 18th-century Altes Palais (Old Palace), the neoclassical Staatliches Museum Schwerin (State Art Museum, built in 1877–1882), and the Staatstheater (City Theater, erected in 1886).
 The city hall (18th century).
 Schelfkirche (Saint Nicolai Church), originally built 1238, but rebuilt in 1713 after destruction by a storm.
 TV Tower Schwerin-Zippendorf.

Museums
 The Staatliches Museum Schwerin-Kunstsammlungen (State Art Museum) houses a remarkable collection of 17th-century Dutch paintings and German art from medieval and renaissance masters up to the present day. There are also a collection of Greek vases, the notable collection of Paintings of Jean-Baptiste Oudry, a collection of sculptures of Houdon, German 18th-century court paintings, and works by such modern artists as Max Liebermann, Franz Stuck, Marcel Duchamp etc. The Graphic cabinet houses rich collections of Dutch and German drawings and prints (Jan van Goyen, Dürer, Cranach, Rembrandt, Merian) and a notable collection of coloured graphics from the time of the GDR.
 The State Museum of Technology (Technische Museum), housed in the former Marstall (Royal Stables). In 2012 the Technische Museum moved to the city of Wismar located 40 km north of Schwerin.

Crime rate
According to the official 2007 Crime Report for Germany, Schwerin was the only German city with a crime rate over 17,000 total offenses committed per 100,000 inhabitants; thus being 1st in the list of Germany's most dangerous cities. The larger cities, such as Berlin, Frankfurt am Main, or Bremen, all have crime rates ranging from 14,000 to 16,000 total offenses committed per 100,000 people. However, Schwerin is the only city where riding a bus (or tram) without a ticket and social security fraud is counted towards the crime rate, significantly boosting the numbers.

Twin towns – sister cities

Schwerin is twinned with:

 Odense, Denmark
 Piła, Poland
 Reggio Emilia, Italy
 Tallinn, Estonia
 Vaasa, Finland
 Växjö, Sweden
 Wuppertal, Germany

Notable people

Konrad Ernst Ackermann (1712–1771), actor
Heike Balck (born 1970), athlete
Hermann Baranowski (1884–1940), Nazi SS concentration camp commandant
Heidrun Bluhm (born 1958), politician (The Left)
Ludwig Bölkow (1912–2003), industrialist
André Brie (born 1950), politician (The Left)
Heinrich von Bülow (1792–1846), diplomat and Prussian statesman
Heinrich Cunow (1862–1938), politician (SPD) and writer
Franziska Ellmenreich (1847–1931), actress
Walther Flemming (1843–1905), biologist and founder of cytogenetics
Heinrich Friese (1860–1948), entomologist and bee researcher
Paul Gösch (1885–1940), painter and architect, Nazi victim
Stephan Gusche (born 1990), footballer
Wilhelm Gustloff (1895–1936), Nazi party leader
Gabriele Hinzmann (born 1947), athlete
Karl Albert von Kamptz (1769–1849), lawyer, Prussian Minister of Justice
Verena Keller (b. 1940), mezzo-soprano
Friedrich Klockmann (1858–1937), mineralogist
Hans von Koester (1844–1928), naval officer
Rosemarie Kother (born 1956), swimmer
Detlef Kübeck (born 1956), sprinter
August Kundt (1839–1894), physicist
Friedrich Ludwig Schröder (1744–1816), actor, theatre director and playwright
Karl Lemcke (1832–1913), art historian, songwriter, rector at the University of Stuttgart
Alexandrine of Mecklenburg-Schwerin (1879–1952), duchess
Adolf Friedrich of Mecklenburg (1873–1969), duke, Africa traveler, colonial politician and first President of the German Olympic Committee
Cecilie of Mecklenburg-Schwerin (1886–1954), duchess, last Crown Princess of the German Empire
Rudolf Metzmacher (1906–2004), cellist
Robert Müller (born 1986), footballer
Hanka Pachale (born 1976), volleyball player
Andrea Pollack (born 1961), swimmer
Oliver Riedel (born 1971), musician of band Rammstein
Sylvia Roll (born 1973), volleyball player
Katrin Sass (born 1956), actress
Bernhard Schwentner (1891–1944), Catholic priest and resistance fighter
Hans Sellschopp (1891–1978), German businessman and Nazi cultural officer
Matthias Stammann (born 1968), footballer
Anke Westendorf (born 1954), volleyball player
Gudrun Zapf-von Hesse (1918–2019), typographer and bookbinder

Gallery

References

External links

  
 Tourism portal of Schwerin 

 
German state capitals
Cities and towns in Mecklenburg
Populated places established in the 12th century
Grand Duchy of Mecklenburg-Schwerin